The 1920–21 İstanbul Football League season was the 14th season of the league. Fenerbahçe won the league for the third time. NB: 3-2-1 point system.

Season

References
 Dağlaroğlu, Rüştü. Fenerbahçe Spor Kulübü Tarihi 1907-1957

Istanbul Football League seasons
Istanbul
Istanbul